Hoisington may refer to:
 Hoisington, Kansas, a town in the United States.
 Elizabeth P. Hoisington, American Army officer, one of the first women to attain the rank of Brigadier General.
 Henry Richard Hoisington, a 19th-century American missionary.